Shahr Asb (also Romanized as Shahr Āsb and Shahrasb; also known as Shahrāb, Shāh Rasm, and Shān Rasm) is a village in Tirjerd Rural District, in the Central District of Abarkuh County, Yazd Province, Iran. At the 2006 census, its population was 618, in 185 families.

References 

Populated places in Abarkuh County